Kerry Alleyne (born 15 December 1983) is a Dominican former international footballer who played as a midfielder.

Career
He made his international debut for Dominica in 2004, and appeared in FIFA World Cup qualifying matches.

References

1983 births
Living people
Dominica footballers
Dominica international footballers
Harlem United FC players
Association football forwards